Katharina Magdalena Brückner (1719-1804) was a German stage actress. She was a celebrated actress in the Neuberschen Gesellschaft and the Koch theater. She married the actor Johann Friedrich Brückner in 1756. From 1775 to 1791, she was a prominent member of the Döbbelinsches Theater in Berlin. She was favored by the king, who often granted her gifts as a token of his admiration and awarded her a full pension when she retired in 1791.

References

Ludwig Eisenberg, Großes biographisches Lexikon der Deutschen Bühne im XIX. Jahrhundert. Verlag von Paul List, Leipzig 1903, S. 132

18th-century German actresses
German stage actresses
1719 births
1804 deaths